The Stewart-Mackenzie executive council was 2nd executive council of British Ceylon. The government was led by Governor James Alexander Stewart-Mackenzie.

Executive council members

See also
 Cabinet of Sri Lanka

Notes

References

1837 establishments in Ceylon
1841 disestablishments in Ceylon
Cabinets established in 1837
Cabinets disestablished in 1841
Ceylonese executive councils
Ministries of Queen Victoria